The Rationalist Union (French: Union rationaliste) is a French  nonprofit organization founded in 1930 that promotes the role of reason. Many of the members are scientists, members of the Institut de France, Nobel Prize laureates, professors at the Collège de France, and famous writers.

The Union is strongly Republican (in the French sense of the term) and Jacobin and is opposed to communitarianism.

The Rationalist Union hosts two radio shows, one on the radio of the French Anarchist Federation, and another on the public radio France Culture, and publishes two journals, Les Cahiers Rationalistes, and Raison Présente.

External links

Humanist associations
1930 establishments in France
Church–state separation advocacy organizations
Criticism of religion
Non-profit organizations based in France
Organizations established in 1930
Secularism in France
Secularist organizations
Separation of church and state
Skeptic organizations in France